Blu Farias Hunt (born July 11, 1995) is an American actress. She is best known for her roles as Inadu/The Hollow in The CW supernatural drama series The Originals (2017) and as August Catawnee in the Netflix science fiction drama series Another Life (2019–2022).

Hunt made her film debut as Danielle Moonstar / Mirage in the superhero film The New Mutants (2020), which is part of the X-Men film series.

Early life 
Blu Hunt was born in Sacramento, California and grew up in a suburban environment. She is Native American and a descendant of the Lakota tribe. Her grandmother is part of the Oglala Lakota Tribe and was from the Pine Ridge Reservation. Her great-grandfather was Apache. She studied at the American Academy of Dramatic Arts.

Career 
In 2017, Hunt received recognition for her recurring role as powerful Native American  witch Inadu (The Hollow) Labonair in the fourth season of The CW supernatural drama series The Originals.

From 2019 to 2021, Hunt starred as August Catawnee, the lead engineer and youngest member of the crew aboard the spaceship Salvare, in the Netflix science fiction drama series Another Life. It was canceled after two seasons.

In 2019, Hunt guest starred in the ABC crime drama series Stumptown.

Hunt made her feature film debut as Danielle Moonstar / Mirage in the superhero horror film The New Mutants, which is part of the X-Men film series. The film was originally intended for release in April 2018, but suffered several delays. It was released on August 28, 2020.

Personal life 
Hunt identifies as “super queer.” She admitted that the best part of her leading role in The New Mutants, in which her character is of Native American descent and becomes romantically involved with another woman, was “knowing that I got to be queer and that I got to represent the Indigenous community.”

Filmography

Film

Television

References

External links 
 
 

1995 births
Living people
21st-century American actresses
21st-century Native Americans
American people of Apache descent
American people of Lakota descent
Native American actresses
Actresses from Sacramento, California
American television actresses
American film actresses
21st-century Native American women
American queer actresses
LGBT Native Americans
21st-century LGBT people